Valkenburg or Van Valkenburg is a Dutch toponymic surname indicating an origin in Valkenburg, Dutch Limburg or  Valkenburg, South Holland.  The name occurs with or without the tussenvoegsel van and has many spelling variants. People with the name include:

Diane Valkenburg (born 1984), Dutch speed skater 
Dirk Valkenburg (1675–1721), Dutch landscape, bird and still life painter
Heidi Valkenburg (born 1980s), Australian actress, artist and writer
Matthew Valkenburg (died 1649), Dutch-born English baronet
Patti Valkenburg (born 1958), Dutch media theorist
Piet Valkenburg (1888–1950), Dutch footballer
Beatrix of Valkenburg (c.1254–1277), Queen consort of the Romans 1269–77, daughter of Dirk II
 (c.1190–1227), originally from the Duchy of Cleves
 (1221–1268), son of Dirk I
 (c.1220–1274), Archbishop of Cologne 1261–71, son of Dirk I
Goswin I of Valkenburg-Heinsberg (died 1128), builder of Valkenburg Castle
 (c.1105–1168), son of Goswin I
 (fl. 1299), Franciscan friar, calligrapher, and miniaturist
Van Valkenburg
Catharine Van Valkenburg Waite (1829–1913), American author, lawyer and women's suffrage activist
Catherine E. Van Valkenburg (1880–1961), American concert pianist
Fred Van Valkenburg (born 1948), American (Montana) Democratic politician
Mac Van Valkenburg (1921–1997), American electrical engineer
Schuyler VanValkenburg (born 1982), American (Virginia) Democratic politician
Zach VanValkenburg (born 1998), American football player
Richard Van Valkenburg (1823–1912), American pioneer settler in Colorado
Wade Van Valkenburg (1899–1985), American (Michigan) Republican politician
(Van) Valckenburch / Valckenburgh / Valkenburgh
Jan Valckenburgh (1623–1667), Dutch civil servant, Director-General of the Dutch Gold Coast 1656–1669
Margaretha van Valckenburch (1565–1650), Dutch shipowner and Dutch East India Company stockholder
Van Valkenburgh, a variant spelling extant in the United States
(Van) Valckenborch / Valckenborgh / Valkenborgh
A Flemish family of landscape painters
Marten van Valckenborch (1535–1612), brother of Lucas
Frederik van Valckenborch (1566–1623), son of Marten
Gillis van Valckenborch (1570–1622), son of Marten
Lucas van Valckenborch (c.1537–1597), brother of Marten
Jan van Valckenborgh (c.1575–1624), Dutch military engineer and fortress builder
Sam Valkenborgh (born 1975), Belgian pop and rap musician

See also
Falkenburg (disambiguation), including a surname
Falckenberg, German surname
Falkenberg (surname), German surname

References

Dutch-language surnames
Surnames of Dutch origin
Toponymic surnames